ŽFK Sloga Zemun is a Serbian women's football club from the city of Zemun. It was founded in 1969 and is the oldest women's football club in Serbia. It currently competes in the highest level of Serbian women's football championship, known as Prva ženska liga. The team has won the championship three times and the women's cup five times, making it the second most successful women's club behind Mašinac Niš.

Titles
 National Championship (3)
 Champion of Yugoslavia: 1978–79, 1979–80
 Champion of Serbia and Montenegro : 1993–94
 National Cup (5)
 Cup of Yugoslavia: 1978–79, 1980–81, 1984–85
 Cup of Serbia and Montenegro : 1992–93, 1993–94

References

External links

Women's football clubs in Serbia
Association football clubs established in 1969
Sport in Zemun